Bofill is a surname. Notable people with the surname include:

Angela Bofill (born 1954), Latin-American R&B singer-songwriter
Anna Bofill (born 1944), Catalan Spanish pianist, architect and composer
Camil Bofill (born 1957, Torelló), Spanish Catalan painter and sculptor
Ricardo Bofill (1939–2022), Spanish architect

See also
Bonfilh (or Bofill), troubadour
Ricardo Bofill Taller de Arquitectura, Spanish architecture firm founded in 1963